Zlato, srebro, dukati is the nineteenth studio album by Bosnian Serb singer Mile Kitić. It was released in 2000 under the label Grand Production.

Track listing

External links
Zlato, srebro, dukati at Discogs

References

2000 albums
Mile Kitić albums
Grand Production albums